Catastrophe or catastrophic comes from the Greek κατά (kata) = down; στροφή (strophē) = turning. It may refer to:

A general or specific event
 Disaster, a devastating event
 The Asia Minor Catastrophe, a Greek name for the 1923 Greek defeat at the Greco-Turkish War (1919–1922) and the population exchange between Greece and Turkey after the defeat
 The Holocaust, also known by the Hebrew name HaShoah which translates to "The Catastrophe"
 The Chernobyl Catastrophe, a name of the 1986 Chernobyl disaster
 Blue sky catastrophe, a type of bifurcation of a periodic orbit, where the orbit vanishes into the blue sky
 Catastrophic failure, complete failure of a system from which recovery is impossible (e.g. a bridge collapses)
 Climatic catastrophe, forced transition of climate system to a new climate state at a rate which is more rapid than the rate of change of the external forcing
 Ecological catastrophe, a disaster to the natural environment due to human activity
 Error catastrophe, extinction of an organism as a result of excessive mutations
 Impending climatic catastrophe, conjectured runaway climate change resulting from a rise in the average temperature of the Earth's climate system
 Infrared catastrophe or infrared divergence is a situation in particle physics in which a particular integral diverges
 Iron catastrophe, runaway melting of early earth's interior as a result of potential energy release from sinking iron and nickel melted by heat of radioactive decay
 Late Bronze Age collapse
 Malthusian catastrophe, prediction of a forced return to subsistence-level conditions once population growth has outpaced agricultural production
 Mitotic catastrophe, an event in which a cell is destroyed during mitosis
 The 1948 Palestinian exodus in Arabic.
 Nedelin catastrophe or Nedelin disaster, launch pad accident at Baikonur test range of Baikonur Cosmodrome
 Oxygen catastrophe, the biologically induced appearance of dioxygen (O2) in Earth's atmosphere
 Runaway climate change or Climatic catastrophe, hypothesized runaway global warming when a tipping point is exceeded
 Toba catastrophe hypothesis, hypothesis that the Toba supervolcanic eruption caused a global volcanic winter and 1,000-year-long cooling episode
 Ultraviolet catastrophe, the prediction by classical physics that a black body will emit radiation at infinite power
 Vacuum catastrophe, the discrepancy between theoretical and measured vacuum energy density in cosmology

Art, entertainment, and media

Fictional entities
 Catastrophe, the main antagonist in The Secret Files of the Spy Dogs

Film
 Catastrophe (film), a 1977 American documentary film
 The Catastrophe (film), a 2011 American short film

Literature
 Catastrophe (book), a 2009 non-fiction book by Dick Morris and Eileen McGann
 Catastrophe (drama), the climax and resolution of a plot in ancient Greek drama and poetry
 Catastrophe (play), a 1982 short play by Samuel Beckett
 Catastrophe: Risk and Response, a 2004 non-fiction book by Richard Posner

Music
 Catastrophic (band), a band featuring Trevor Peres

Television
 Catastrophe (2008 TV series), a five-part science series on Channel 4, presented by Tony Robinson
 Catastrophe (2015 TV series), a 2015 sitcom starring Sharon Horgan and Rob Delaney

Mathematics
 Catastrophe theory, a theory by the French mathematician René Thom and the object of its study

See also
 Cape Catastrophe
 Catastrophisation
 Catastrophism
 Katastrophe (disambiguation)